Anna Fitzpatrick (born 6 April 1989) is a British former professional tennis player.

Personal life
Fitzpatrick attended St Thomas of Canterbury school in Sheffield, St Mary's Roman Catholic High School, Chesterfield and Woodhouse Grove School in Apperley Bridge, City of Bradford. She has three older brothers named Chris, Peter and Michael, who were all keen tennis players themselves and very supportive of their sister. Growing up, she played tennis at Beauchief Tennis Club and at Graves Tennis Centre.

Playing style
Fitzpatrick liked to play aggressively, coming to the net as often as possible. When at the back of the court she was looking for opportunities to attack, and often tried to serve and volley to change the pace of the match. According to Fitzpatrick, her volley was "what [her] whole game is built on" and her least favourite surface is clay.

Career

Junior (2003–2007)
Fitzpatrick's first match on the junior ITF circuit came in July 2003 and her last in June 2007. During her four-year junior tennis career, she did not reach any tournament finals but reached the semi-finals of three tournaments, one of which was the 2007 Wimbledon girls' tournament where she lost to eventual champion, Urszula Radwańska, 6–7(3), 3–6. She also lost in the quarterfinals of a total of five tournaments. Her win–loss record for singles competition was 25–26.

As a junior doubles competitor, Fitzpatrick won one tournament (partnering Jade Curtis) and was a runner-up in another. She was also a semi-finalist four times and lost in the quarterfinals in nine tournaments. One of the tournaments in which Fitzpatrick became a quarterfinalist was in the 2007 Wimbledon girls' doubles tournament with Jade Curtis. She ended her junior career with a doubles win–loss record of 27–28. Her career-high combined singles and doubles ranking was world No. 180 (achieved 9 July 2007).

2004–2006
Fitzpatrick played her first professional match on the adult ITF Circuit in September 2004 when she attempted to qualify for the $10k event in Manchester. She lost in the second round of qualifying. Her only other tournament during 2004 was the $10k in Bolton where she also lost in round two of qualifying. She finished 2004 without a world ranking.

2005 saw Fitzpatrick play in a total of eleven ITF tournaments. She lost in round two in two tournaments, the first round in three and the qualifying stages a total of six times. Her very first year-end ranking was world No. 1102.

In 2006, Fitzpatrick made very little progress on the ITF Circuit until August when she won her first ever ITF title in the $10k event in Ilkley without losing a set in the entire tournament. She beat fellow British teen, Anna Smith, in the final, 6–4, 6–3. She carried this momentum over into her next tournament (Wrexham $10k) where she reached the semi-finals and she also made a run into the final of her next tournament, the $10k in London. She was beaten by Nadja Roma, 3–6, 3–6, in the final. She finished the season with her ranking at world No. 676.

2007
In March 2007, Fitzpatrick reached the third ITF singles final of her career in Sunderland $10k where she lost to Gaëlle Widmer in straight sets, 4–6, 1–6. In April she became a quarterfinalist in the $10,000 event in Bath and one month later she lost in the quarterfinals of a $25k event in Antalya as a qualifier. June saw Fitzpatrick make her debut on the WTA Tour when she was given a wildcard into the qualifying draw of the DFS Classic. She faced American, Lilia Osterloh, in the first round and was unable to capitalise on her one set lead, eventually losing, 7–5, 3–6, 1–6.

Fitzpatrick earned a wildcard into the qualifying event for Wimbledon one week later by winning two matches in the LTA Wildcard Play-offs. She managed to beat Junri Namigata, a player ranked 278 places above her, in the first round of the qualifying tournament with a score of 7–5, 6–0. The No. 8 seed in the qualifying tournament, Mathilde Johansson, proved too much for Fitzpatrick in round two and Fitzpatrick lost, 1–6, 2–6. In July, she reached the semifinals of a $10k event in Calgary (where she won the doubles tournament to give her the first doubles title of her career) and in September she reached the semifinals of another $10k event, this one in Nottingham. She did not pass the second round in any other ITF tournaments that season and finished the year with a ranking of world No. 383.

2008
In April 2008, Fitzpatrick reached her first ITF quarterfinal of the year in Toluca, a $10k tournament. Just two weeks later she reached her second of the year, this one in Irapuato $25k. In June, the first of four consecutive wildcards allowed her direct entry into the main draw of the $50k event in Surbiton where she lost to Georgie Stoop in round one. Her second wild card of June entered her into the main draw of the DFS Classic, a Tier III tournament. She was beaten by Melanie South, 4–6, 4–6, in round one. Wild card number three allowed her access into the qualifying draw of the International Women's Open where world No. 62, Ekaterina Makarova, beat her in straight sets, 6–7(4), 3–6. Her fourth of four consecutive wild cards gave her entry into the qualifying draw of Wimbledon where she was beaten by Yuliana Fedak from Ukraine. In early August, Fitzpatrick injured her foot while playing in an ITF in Portugal. The injury turned out to be a stress fracture in her left foot and it put her out of action for the rest of the season and as a result, she ended the season ranked world No. 424.

2009
Fitzpatrick returned to the ITF Circuit in March 2009. In her very first tournament since injuring her foot, she partnered Stefania Boffa to win the title at the $10k tournament in Bath. She and Boffa again joined forced in their next tournament, the $25k in Jersey, where they reached the semifinals. She made her first real impact in singles in July when she reached a $10k quarterfinal before immediately going on to reach the final of another $10k. She beat the fourth, fifth and sixth seeds before losing to Heather Watson, 6–4, 4–6, 2–6, in the final. In August, Fitzpatrick played her final tournament of 2009 (a $10k in London) where she was beaten by compatriot, Jocelyn Rae, in the semifinals. During this tournament, her foot injury worsened once again and forced her out until March/April 2010. As a result of this, Fitzpatrick's year-end singles ranking for 2009 was 761.

ITF Circuit finals

Singles (3–4)

Doubles (19–13)

References

External links
 
 

1989 births
Living people
Sportspeople from Sheffield
British female tennis players
English people of Irish descent
People educated at Woodhouse Grove School
English female tennis players
Tennis people from South Yorkshire
21st-century British women